Surfing at the 2019 Southeast Asian Games in the Philippines was held at waters off Barangay Urbiztondo in San Juan, La Union.

Surfing was held from 2 to 8 December 2019. There were concerns that surfing events were about to be suspended due to Typhoon Kammuri (Tisoy) affecting the waves in the venue.

Four gold medals were at stake in surfing; in men's and women's shortboard and in men's and women's longboard.

Roger Casugay gave up a gold medal position to save a fellow Indonesian competitor from drowning. Casugay, won hearts on social media with his kind deed, eventually won a rematch against Nurhidayat and bested fellow Filipino surfer Rogelio Esquivel for the gold medal.

Participating nations

Six nations participated in surfing.

Medal table

Medalists

Men

Women

References

External links
 

2019 Southeast Asian Games events